Ernst Friedrich Wilhelm Meumann (29 August 1862, Uerdingen, Krefeld – 26 April 1915, Hamburg, Germany) was a German educator, pedagogist and psychologist, the founder of experimental pedagogy.

Works 
Die Sprache des Kindes (1903)
Über Ökonomie und Technik des Lernens (1903)
Der Verzug des Schuldners nach dem Recht des BGB für das Deutsche Reich (1907, 1911)
Intelligenz und Wille. (1908, 1913, 1920, 1925)
Ökonomie und Technik des Gedächtnisses (1908)
Vorlesungen zur Einführung in die experimentelle Pädagogik (1907, 1912, 1920)
System der Ästhetik (1914)
Abriss der experimentellen Pädagogik (1914)
The psychology of learning: an experimental investigation of the economy and technique of memory. 2012, Nabu press. ISBN 9781279520284

See also 
 Pedagogy
 Education
 Psychology

References

External links

 

1862 births
1915 deaths
German educational theorists
People from Krefeld